Not Now (originally titled as Pudgy in "Not Now") is a 1936 Fleischer Studios animated short films starring Betty Boop and Pudgy the Pup. It is now public domain.

Synopsis
A noisy cat is preventing Betty Boop from getting any sleep at night. When Betty asks the cat to be quiet, it replies "not ne-ow". Pudgy tries to chase the cat away, and after much trouble, he seemingly succeeds . . . until all the cats in the neighborhood appear outside Betty's window.

References

External links
 
 Not Now on YouTube
 Downloadable cartoon at archive.org (public domain, MPEG4, 7.6MB)
Not Now at Big Cartoon Database.

1936 short films
Betty Boop cartoons
1930s American animated films
American black-and-white films
1936 animated films
Paramount Pictures short films
Fleischer Studios short films
Animated films about cats
Short films directed by Dave Fleischer
Animated films about dogs
1930s English-language films
American animated short films